Tunisian Alternative (al-Badil Ettounsi) is a Tunisian political party founded on 29 March 2017 by former prime minister Mehdi Jomaa.

History 
The party started as a think tank founded by Jomaa in February 2016 named Tunisia Alternatives.

Ideology 
The party aims to "unite Tunisians" and be "non-ideological" and "merit-based".

References

Political parties in Tunisia
Political parties established in 2017